The Twin Cities Hiawatha, often just Hiawatha, was a named passenger train  operated by the Chicago, Milwaukee, St. Paul and Pacific Railroad (also known as the Milwaukee Road), and traveled from Chicago to the Twin Cities. The original train takes its name from the epic poem The Song of Hiawatha by Henry Wadsworth Longfellow. There are a number of Hiawatha-themed names within the city of Minneapolis, the terminus of the original train. The first Hiawatha ran in 1935; in 1939 the Milwaukee Road introduced a second daily trip between Chicago and Minneapolis. The two trains were known as the Morning Hiawatha and Afternoon Hiawatha, or sometimes the AM Twin Cities Hiawatha and PM Twin Cities Hiawatha. The Milwaukee Road discontinued the Afternoon Hiawatha in 1970 while the Morning Hiawatha continued running until the formation of Amtrak in 1971.

History

In the 1930s three railroads fiercely competed for daytime passengers on the Chicago–Minneapolis/St. Paul corridor: the Milwaukee Road, the Chicago, Burlington and Quincy Railroad (the Burlington), and the Chicago and North Western Railway (C&NW). In 1934 each of the railroads committed to introducing new services which would reduce the travel time to 6½ hours to St. Paul. The Burlington introduced the Twin Cities Zephyr, a diesel-powered streamlined trainset, while the C&NW's Twin Cities 400 used refurbished steam locomotives and conventional passenger equipment. The Milwaukee Road ordered new steam locomotives from American Locomotive Company and constructed new passenger cars in its own shops. All three trains entered service in 1935.

Patronage was good and the consist grew from five cars to as many as nine.

In October 1936 the Milwaukee Road re-equipped the Hiawatha with new "1937" Hiawatha trains, improving on the 1935 design. They had a baggage-‘Tip Top Tap’ car, four coaches, a dining car, and three parlor cars, including a new Beaver Tail parlor-observation car. The new cars featured fluted sides, in contrast to the smooth sides of the 1935 edition. The regular consist was nine cars.

In September 1938 the train was re-equipped again with the "1939" Hiawatha with its famous finned Beaver Tail observation car, designed by noted industrial designer Otto Kuhler. Kuhler also styled the new Class F7 4-6-4 “Hudsons” which displaced the Class As.

Two Hiawathas 

From January 21, 1939, the Twin Cities Hiawatha became two trains: the Morning Hiawatha (trains 5 and 6), and the Afternoon Hiawatha (trains 100 and 101). With the delivery of the 1939 trainsets, the original 1935 Hiawatha equipment was reassigned to the Chicago to Omaha/Sioux City route where it ran as the Midwest Hiawatha. Another train, The North Woods Hiawatha, ran with older cars from earlier series also.

In June 1941 the two afternoon trains were scheduled for six hours fifteen minutes between Chicago and St. Paul and another half hour to Minneapolis; the eastward morning train took five minutes more, and the westward made more stops and was scheduled for eight hours fifteen minutes to Minneapolis.

Two sets of passenger diesel locomotives appeared in 1941: a back to back pair of Alco/GE DL-107 locomotives, the #14, and a back to back pair of EMD E-6, the #15. The Twin Cities Hiawatha was partially equipped in May 1942 with coaches, two diners, and two 'Tip Top Tap' cars which ran with the 1939 Beaver Tails and parlors. Older series of cars were modified with skirting to run with the newer consists. During the following War years, the trains had as many as 15 cars, and one of the 1942 cars painted in patriotic red, white & blue proclaiming "Buy War Bonds". Trains were so full that people had to sit on suitcases or stand in aisles.

In 1947–1948 the Milwaukee Road again re-equipped its major passenger routes with new lightweight cars. The new Morning Hiawatha and Afternoon Hiawatha were inaugurated with diesel-powered trains designed by Brooks Stevens. The new trains included the Skytop parlor observation cars. These four cars had a drawing room and swiveling parlor seats, and at the rear there was a lounge area with an expanse of windows. (One of these cars, #186 Cedar Rapids has been restored and is owned by a Minneapolis-based organization that operates the Milwaukee Road 261 steam locomotive.) The new trains made their debut on May 29, 1948, the thirteenth anniversary of the first Hiawatha.

In 1952 the Milwaukee Road took delivery of ten "Super Dome" cars. Six were assigned to the Olympian Hiawatha and two each to the Morning and Afternoon Hiawathas. Both trains had coaches, a Super Dome lounge car, dining car (sometimes a Tip Top Tap car), Valley-series parlor cars, and the distinctive Skytop lounge observation car. Starting in 1955, with the Milwaukee Road handling the Union Pacific "Cities" trains between Chicago and Omaha, passenger equipment was painted in the Union Pacific armour yellow and harbor-mist grey with red Scotchlite striping. The rest of the fleet was painted this way, except for the heavyweight commuter cars in Chicago.

On July 18, 1960, the eastbound Afternoon Hiawatha struck a truck in the crossing in Newport, Minnesota, and derailed. Dozens of passengers on the train to Chicago suffered minor injuries, but only ten were hospitalized overnight. 

The Afternoon Hiawatha ended on January 23, 1970. The Morning Hiawatha continued until the formation of Amtrak, making its last run on April 30, 1971. Amtrak retained a single Chicago-Minneapolis frequency with the Burlington Northern's Empire Builder, which was re-routed over the Milwaukee Road's line through Milwaukee to St. Paul.

Amtrak
Amtrak brought back the name Twin Cities Hiawatha as a Chicago-Minneapolis service on January 16, 1972. On June 12 that year Amtrak combined this service with the North Coast Hiawatha; three days a week the train continued to Seattle, otherwise it terminated at Minneapolis. In 1977 Amtrak again established a Twin Cities Hiawatha as a daily Chicago-Minneapolis train, but ended this service in 1978 with the introduction of the North Star, a Chicago-Minneapolis-Duluth sleeper. Today, the Hiawatha name still lives on with Chicago-Milwaukee Amtrak Hiawatha Service, and Amtrak's Empire Builder traverses the original route of the Twin Cities Hiawatha between Chicago and St. Paul.

Amtrak is also planning to start a new train service called the Great River which will travel between Chicago and St. Paul, along the same route with two extra stops in Sturtevant and Milwaukee Airport, and a potential extension to Minneapolis and St. Cloud later on. The train is scheduled to begin service in summer 2023.

Route
The Twin Cities Hiawatha ran on the railroad's main line from Chicago and Milwaukee to St. Paul and Minneapolis. Originally only five intermediate stops were made between Milwaukee and St. Paul. Later other stops were added, as well as Glenview, Illinois between Chicago and Milwaukee. When the Hiawatha began in 1935 about half the line had cab signaling that lit white, green, or red lights in the locomotive cab.  A whistle would sound if the red signal came on.

The current route, consisting of five subdivisions, is now owned by the Soo Line Railroad, an in-name-only division of the Canadian Pacific Railway.

C&M Subdivision - Chicago to Milwaukee
Watertown Subdivision - Milwaukee to Portage, WI
Tomah Subdivision - Portage to La Crosse, WI
River Subdivision (Canadian Pacific Railway) - La Crosse to St. Paul
Merriam Park Subdivision - St. Paul to Minneapolis "Short Line"

The current Amtrak Empire Builder in the Chicago to St. Paul portion follows this route.

Notes

References

External links

1945 Hiawatha advertisement
Milwaukee Road Hiawathas in 1938
1938 timetable
1954 timetable

Named passenger trains of the United States
Passenger trains of the Milwaukee Road
Railway services introduced in 1935
Former Amtrak routes
Railway services discontinued in 1971